A conditioner is something that improves the quality of another material.

Conditioner may more specifically refer to:

 Conditioner (chemistry)
 Conditioner (farming)
 Air conditioner
 Fabric conditioner
 Hair conditioner
 Leather conditioner
 Power conditioner
 The apparatus that contains most of the resurfacing components on an ice resurfacer

See also
 
 
 Condition (disambiguation)